Dolni Balvan is a village in the municipality of Karbinci, North Macedonia.

Demographics
According to the 2002 census, the village had a total of 358 inhabitants. Ethnic groups in the village include:

Macedonians 356
Serbs 2

References

Villages in Karbinci Municipality